Kwesimintsim is a residential town in the Western region of Ghana. It is about 5 kilometres westwards from Takoradi   the regional capital. The town under the Effia-Kwesimintsim constituency of Ghana.

Boundary
The town is bounded to the west by Apremodo to the east by Takoradi to the North by Anaji and south by Airport Ridge.

References

Populated places in the Western Region (Ghana)